Everett High School may refer to:

Everett High School (Massachusetts), Everett, Massachusetts
Everett High School (Michigan), Lansing, Michigan
Everett High School (Maryville, Tennessee), Maryville, Tennessee
Everett High School (Washington), Everett, Washington
Everett Alvarez High School, Salinas, California
Everett Area Junior-Senior High School, Everett, Pennsylvania
Mount Everett Regional School, Sheffield, Massachusetts